James Richard Poole (born April 28, 1966) is a former pitcher in Major League Baseball (MLB) who was a relief pitcher from  through . He is most notable for having appeared in the 1995 World Series with the Cleveland Indians.

Poole pitched for the Georgia Tech baseball team from 1985–1988, and attended La Salle College High School in Wyndmoor, Pennsylvania.

He was traded from the Los Angeles Dodgers to the Texas Rangers for minor-league pitchers Steve Allen and David Lynch and cash on December 29. 1990. He was designated for assignment by the Rangers on May 26, 1991 and claimed off waivers by the Baltimore Orioles five days later on May 31. He was the final Orioles winning pitcher at Memorial Stadium in a 7–3 victory over the Detroit Tigers in the penultimate MLB game ever at that ballpark on October 5, 1991. He became a free agent for the first time when the Orioles declined to offer him a contract on December 23, 1994 amid a players strike. He had been the Orioles' alternate players representative and a member of the Major League Baseball Players Association's pension committee. 

He was signed as a free agent by the Cleveland Indians on four occasions: March 18, ; July 22, ; August 26, ; and June 9, . He appeared twice with the Indians in the 1995 World Series, both losses to the Braves at Atlanta–Fulton County Stadium. He retired all three batters faced in the seventh inning of Game 2. He was the losing pitcher in the decisive Game 6, giving up the only run of the contest. He relieved starting pitcher Dennis Martínez with Mark Lemke at second, Chipper Jones at first and two outs in the fifth and struck out Fred McGriff on three pitches. The next batter Poole faced to start the bottom of the sixth was David Justice who, with a 1–1 count, hit a high-and inside fastball for a home run over the right-field fence. Poole said after the Series-ending loss, "It was a pitch that was supposed to be down and away, and it was up and in. If I don't throw that pitch, we're still playing." Prior to the homer in the top of the sixth, he had his first MLB at bat in which he fouled out to McGriff in an unsuccessful attempt to bunt over to second Tony Peña who had led off the inning with the Indians' only hit of the match.

He was acquired along with cash by the San Francisco Giants from the Indians for Mark Carreon on July 9, . He had pitched  innings in 32 games with a 4–0 record and a 3.04 earned run average (ERA) prior to the trade. The Giants addressed a need for left-handed pitchers at the time of the transaction.

In 2021, Poole was diagnosed with amyotrophic lateral sclerosis.

References

External links
, or Retrosheet, or Pelota Binaria (Venezuelan Winter League)

1966 births
Living people
Akron Aeros players
American expatriate baseball players in Canada
Bakersfield Dodgers players
Baltimore Orioles players
Baseball players at the 1987 Pan American Games
Baseball players from New York (state)
Buffalo Bisons (minor league) players
Cleveland Indians players
Detroit Tigers players
Georgia Tech Yellow Jackets baseball players
Hagerstown Suns players
Los Angeles Dodgers players
Major League Baseball pitchers
Montreal Expos players
Navegantes del Magallanes players
American expatriate baseball players in Venezuela
Oklahoma City 89ers players
Pan American Games medalists in baseball
Pan American Games silver medalists for the United States
Philadelphia Phillies players
Rochester Red Wings players
San Antonio Missions players
San Francisco Giants players
Sportspeople from Rochester, New York
Texas Rangers players
Vero Beach Dodgers players
Medalists at the 1987 Pan American Games
People with motor neuron disease